The Monarch Icefield is the northernmost of a series of large continental icecaps studding the heights of the Pacific Ranges of the Coast Mountains in southern British Columbia.  Located southeast of the town of Bella Coola and west of the headwaters of the Atnarko River, a tributary of the Bella Coola River, it lies to the north of the Ha-Iltzuk Icefield, which is the largest icefield of the group and home to the Silverthrone volcano.  The Monarch Icefield is very remote and is rarely visited by mountaineering parties.

References

BCGNIS listing "Monarch Icefield"

Central Coast of British Columbia
Glaciers of the Pacific Ranges
Ice fields of British Columbia